The 2014–15 Maryland Eastern Shore Hawks men's basketball team represented the University of Maryland Eastern Shore during the 2014–15 NCAA Division I men's basketball season. The Hawks, led by first year head coach Bobby Collins, played their home games at the Hytche Athletic Center and were members of the Mid-Eastern Athletic Conference. They finished the season 18–15, 11–5 in MEAC play to finish in third place. They lost in the quarterfinals of the MEAC tournament to Hampton. They were invited to the CollegeInsider.com Tournament where they lost in the first round to High Point.

Roster

Schedule

|-
!colspan=9 style="background:#800000; color:#808080;"| Exhibition

|-
!colspan=9 style="background:#800000; color:#808080;"| Regular season

|-
!colspan=9 style="background:#800000; color:#808080;"|  MEAC tournament

|-
!colspan=9 style="background:#800000; color:#808080;"| CIT

References

Maryland Eastern Shore Hawks men's basketball seasons
Maryland Eastern Shore
Maryland Eastern Shore